James Mickey is an American former Negro league third baseman who played in the 1940s.

Mickey played for the Birmingham Black Barons in 1940. In three recorded games, he went hitless in seven plate appearances.

References

External links
 and Seamheads

Year of birth missing
Place of birth missing
Birmingham Black Barons players
Baseball third basemen